The Quad City Steamwheelers are an indoor American football team that began play in 2018. They played their first season as part of the Champions Indoor Football, but have joined the Indoor Football League prior to their second season. Based in Moline, Illinois, the Steamwheelers play their home games at the Vibrant Arena at The MARK. The team announced it would be dormant for the 2021 season due to the arena capacity restrictions caused by the COVID-19 pandemic.

The Steamwheelers are named after the Quad Cities' previous team of the same name, which played in all ten of the AF2's seasons (2000–2009) and won the first two ArenaCups.

History
After the original Quad City Steamwheelers folded along with the AF2, TaxSlayer Center director Scott Mullen had been in talks with various investors seeking to bring back the Steamwheelers, but none were financially secure enough to meet his standards.  During 2017, a splash page emerged allegedly belonging to a revived Steamwheelers team in the CIF, however, neither Mullen nor the CIF would comment on the page.

On August 15, 2017, the Center confirmed that a deal had been reached which would see the Wheelers return as members of the CIF for 2018, with a press conference taking place the following day.  At the press conference, the Wheelers introduced their owner/general manager Doug Bland (previously part-owner of fellow CIF team the Dallas Marshals) and head coach Cory Ross (most recently head coach for the Omaha Beef).

After one season in the CIF, the Steamwheelers announced they were joining the Indoor Football League for the 2019 season.

After playing only one game in 2020, the Steamwheelers' season was initially postponed and the league's season was eventually cancelled due to the COVID-19 pandemic. On October 23, 2020, the team announced that due to the restrictions on arena capacity during the pandemic, they would be dormant for at least the 2021 season. In September 2021, they announced they planned to return for the 2022 season.

Roster

Statistics and records

Season-by-season results

References

External links
 Official website

American football teams in Illinois
Former Champions Indoor Football teams
Indoor Football League teams
Steamwheelers
American football teams established in 2018
2018 establishments in Illinois